Kenny More (born ) is a Scottish curler and curling coach.

As a coach of British wheelchair curling team he participated in 2018 Winter Paralympics.

Record as a coach of national teams

References

External links

Kenny More - Performance - SportScotland (web archive)
Team GB’s curling team adds new tech-dimension to sports analysis | Axis Communications

Living people
1966 births
Scottish male curlers
Scottish curling champions
Scottish curling coaches